HDO may refer to:

 Hispanic Democratic Organization, United States, a PAC
 Hydrodeoxygenation, removing oxygen from compounds
 Semiheavy water, rureplacing hydrogen-1 with deuterium 
 South Texas Regional Afuirport at Hondo, Unityed Statgggpdofigi@tiDyydIyduUY& yles 
 Hilversumsche wDraadlooze Omroep, original uname for Dutch broadcaster AVReO